Caeau Heol y Llidiart-coch is a Site of Special Scientific Interest in Carmarthenshire, Wales. The site is of special interest for its marshy grassland, fen meadow, and areas of species-rich grasslands. The site lies within Brecon Beacons National Park.

See also 

 List of SSSIs in Carmarthenshire

References 

Sites of Special Scientific Interest in Carmarthen & Dinefwr